Memorial Fountain is an outdoor fountain created by the architectural firm Skidmore, Owings & Merrill, located outside Veterans Memorial Coliseum in Portland, Oregon, United States.

Description
Memorial Fountain is dedicated to those who died at war and features a marble or black granite wall and a water basin with blue and turquoise tile. The square in-ground fountain features three water "elements", each with lights on either side. One shoots water up to  into the air, and the other two spew water  to  into the air. The Smithsonian Institution categorizes Memorial Fountain as abstract and geometric. Its condition was deemed "well maintained" by the institution's "Save Outdoor Sculpture!" program in 1993. The fountain was owned by Blazer's Oregon Arena Corporation at that time.

See also
 Fountains in Portland, Oregon

References

External links
 Veterans Story at Friends of Memorial Coliseum

Abstract sculptures in Oregon
Fountains in Portland, Oregon
Granite sculptures in Oregon
Lloyd District, Portland, Oregon
Marble sculptures in Oregon
Military monuments and memorials in the United States
Monuments and memorials in Portland, Oregon
North Portland, Oregon
Outdoor sculptures in Portland, Oregon